LVF may refer to:

 Loyalist Volunteer Force, a paramilitary group in Northern Ireland
 Légion des volontaires français contre le bolchévisme, a French collaborationist military unit in the German Army
 Left ventricular failure, a heart condition
 Land-vertebrate faunachron, a biochronology system primarily used for Triassic tetrapods
 Lineated valley fill, a geologic feature observed on Mars

See also
 Linux Vendor Firmware Service (LVFS), an online repository for obtaining updates